Dumitru Dolgov (born 24 August 1987) is a Moldovan former footballer.

Career 
Dolgov began his career with Ukrainian club FC Stal Alchevsk and came in 2006 to Moldova and signed for FC Nistru Otaci.

He was offered a contract from FC Terek Grozny in early 2008 and joined the Russian Premier League club. Dumitru played only 7 matches during the 2008 season because of an injury. In January 2011 he returned to Moldova and signed for FC Sfîntul Gheorghe. After a half year with FC Sfîntul Gheorghe in August 2011 he joined league rival FC Costuleni.

International career 
In 2006 he became the Moldova citizen and played for the Moldova national under-21 team.

Notes 

1987 births
Living people
People from Luhansk Oblast
Moldovan footballers
Moldova under-21 international footballers
Association football defenders
FC Stal Alchevsk players
FC Stal-2 Alchevsk players
FC Nistru Otaci players
FC Akhmat Grozny players
FC Sfîntul Gheorghe players
FC Costuleni players
FC Veris Chișinău players
FC Dinamo-Auto Tiraspol players
Moldovan Super Liga players
Russian Premier League players
Moldovan expatriate footballers
Expatriate footballers in Russia
Moldovan expatriate sportspeople in Russia
Expatriate footballers in Ukraine
Moldovan expatriate sportspeople in Ukraine